Mistaken may refer to:
 Mistaken (novel), a 2011 novel by Neil Jordan
 Mistaken Creek, a stream in Kentucky
 Mistaken identity, a claim of the actual innocence of a criminal defendant
 Mistaken Point, Newfoundland and Labrador, a small Canadian headland

See also
 Mistaken Identity (disambiguation)
 Mistake (disambiguation)
 The Mistake (disambiguation)